Charles Asselineau (13 March 1820 – 25 July 1874) was a French writer and art critic. He is also notable as one of the few close friends of the poet Charles Baudelaire. He was born in Paris and died in Châtel-guyon.

Biography
Asselineau studied in the Lycée Condorcet where he became friends with Nadar. He started medical studies before switching to literary studies.

He met and became a close friend of Baudelaire in 1845. A year after Baudelaire's death, Asselineau together with Banville published a 3rd edition of Les fleurs du mal. In 1869, he writes the first biography of Baudelaire: .

Further reading
 Auguste Auzas, Lettres de Madame Veuve Aupick à Charles Asselineau, vol. XCIX, Mercure de France, 16 September 1912, pp. 225-257
 Auguste Poulet-Malassis, Lettres à Charles Asselineau (1854-1873) (definitive edition, edited and annotated by Christophe Carrère), Paris, Honoré Champion, coll. "Bibliothèque des correspondances", 2013
 Nadar. Correspondance. 1820-1851. Tome 1 (ed. André Rouillé). Éditions Jacqueline Chambon, 1998
 Baudelaire. Œuvres complètes. Tomes 1 et 2. Bibliothèque de la Pléiade. Gallimard, 1976
 Catherine Delons, L'Idée si douce d'une mère, Charles Baudelaire et Caroline Aupick, Les Belles Lettres, 2011
 Catherine Delons, Narcisse Ancelle, persécuteur ou protecteur de Baudelaire, Du Lérot, 2002
 Claude Pichois and Jean-Paul Avice, Dictionnaire Baudelaire, Du Lérot, 2002
 Jacques Crépet and Claude Pichois, Baudelaire et Asselineau, textes recueillis et commentés, Nizet, 1953

French art critics
19th-century French writers
Writers from Paris
1820 births
1874 deaths